Wigglesworth is a village and civil parish in the Craven district of North Yorkshire, England. The population of the civil parish taken at the 2011 Census was 379. It is on the road between Long Preston to the east, Clitheroe to the south and the small village of Rathmell lies just to the north.

Despite the small size of the village, it has a public house called the Plough Inn. Wigglesworth consists of a few small scattered houses and farmsteads. The heart of the village lies on the crossroads between Clitheroe, Rathmell and Long Preston.

A former Wesleyan chapel stands on the B6478 road in the western part of the settlement.

References

External links

Village website

Villages in North Yorkshire
Craven District
Civil parishes in North Yorkshire